Peltae (Peltæ) or Peltai was a city and bishopric of ancient Phrygia in Asia Minor, which remains a Catholic titular see.

History 
Peltae was a considerable town of Phrygia, was situated, according to Xenophon, at a distance of 10 parasangs from Celaenae, at the head of the river Maeander. Xenophon describes it as a populous city, and states that the army of Cyrus the Younger remained there three days, during which games and sacrifices were performed. The Tabula Peutingeriana, where the name is erroneously written Pella, places it, quite in accordance with Xenophon, 26 miles from Apamea Cibotus, to the conventus of which Peltae belonged. Strabo mentions Peltae among the smaller towns of Phrygia, and the Notitiae Episcopatuum name it among the episcopal cities of the Roman province of Phrygia Pacatiana Prima to be a suffragan of its capital Laodicea in Phrygia's metropolitan Archbishopric. The district in which the town was situated derived from it the name of the Peltaean plain (Πελτηνόν or Πελτινὸν πεδίον).

Location
Peltae's site is not known, and several scholars have offered opinions as to its location. It is probable that it is located southwest of Eumeneia.

Titular see 
The diocese was nominally restored in 1933 as Titular bishopric under the names of Peltae (Latin), adjective Pelten(us) / Pelte (Curiate Italian).

It is vacant since decades, having only had the following incumbent(s), so far of the fitting Episcopal (lowest) rank :
 Stephen Stanislaus Woznicki (1937.12.13 – 1950.03.28) as Auxiliary Bishop of Detroit (USA) (1937.12.13 – 1950.03.28), later Bishop of Saginaw (USA) (1950.03.28 – 1968.10.30), emeritate as Titular Bishop of Thiava (1968.10.30 – death 1968.12.10).

References

External links 
 GCatholic - data for all sections

Populated places in Phrygia
Former populated places in Turkey
Roman towns and cities in Turkey
Populated places of the Byzantine Empire
Catholic titular sees in Asia
Lost ancient cities and towns